Missionary schools in Malaysia have their origins derived from British colonialism.

Background
Under the Aziz report, many missionary schools opted to be nationalised in 1971.

Statistics
Nearly half of such schools are located in the Christian-majority Sarawak state.

Primary schools

Methodist schools
 Sekolah Kebangsaan Methodist, Nibong Tebal
 Sekolah Kebangsaan Pykett Methodist
 Sekolah Kebangsaan Perempuan Methodist, Pulau Pinang
 Sekolah Kebangsaan Ho Seng Ong Methodist
 Sekolah Kebangsaan Horley Methodist
 Sekolah Kebangsaan Methodist, Ayer Tawar
 Sekolah Kebangsaan Methodist, Ipoh
 Sekolah Kebangsaan Perempuan Methodist, Ipoh
 Sekolah Kebangsaan Methodist, Parit Buntar
 Sekolah Kebangsaan Methodist, Sitiawan
 Sekolah Kebangsaan Methodist, Sungai Siput
 Sekolah Kebangsaan Methodist, Taiping
 Sekolah Kebangsaan Methodist (Acs), Lumut
 Sekolah Kebangsaan (P) Treacher Methodist
 Sekolah Kebangsaan Methodist, Tanjong Malim
 Sekolah Kebangsaan Methodist, Tanjong Rambutan
 Sekolah Kebangsaan Perempuan Methodist, Teluk Intan
 Sekolah Kebangsaan Methodist (1)
 Sekolah Kebangsaan Methodist, Lumut
 Sekolah Kebangsaan Methodist, Malim Nawar
 Anglo Chinese School, Klang
 Sekolah Kebangsaan Methodist (Integ) (M)
 Sekolah Kebangsaan Methodist (M)
 Sekolah Kebangsaan Methodist Acs, Selangor
 Sekolah Kebangsaan Methodist, Petaling Jaya
 Methodist Girls' School, Klang
 Sekolah Kebangsaan Methodist Jalan Stadium
 Sekolah Kebangsaan Methodist (L) Jalan Hang Jebat (M)
 Sekolah Kebangsaan (P) Methodist (2), Kuala Lumpur
 Sekolah Kebangsaan Methodist Acs, Melaka
 Sekolah Kebangsaan (P) Methodist (1), Melaka
 Sekolah Kebangsaan (P) Methodist (2), Melaka
 Sekolah Kebangsaan Perempuan Methodist, Kuantan
 Sekolah Kebangsaan Perempuan Methodist, Pahang
 Sekolah Kebangsaan Methodist, Kapit
 Sekolah Kebangsaan Methodist Anglo-Chinese

Convent schools
 Sekolah Kebangsaan Convent, Kedah
 Sekolah Kebangsaan Convent Father Barre
 Sekolah Kebangsaan Convent 1, Butterworth
 Sekolah Kebangsaan St Anne's Convent, Jalan Kulim
 Sekolah Kebangsaan Convent, Green Lane
 Sekolah Kebangsaan Convent, Lebuh Light
 Sekolah Kebangsaan Convent, Pulau Tikus
 Sekolah Jenis Kebangsaan (C) Convent Datuk Keramat
 Sekolah Kebangsaan Convent, Sitiawan
 Sekolah Kebangsaan Convent, Ipoh
 Sekolah Jenis Kebangsaan (C) Ave Maria Convent
 Sekolah Kebangsaan Tarcisian Convent
 Sekolah Kebangsaan Marian Convent
 Sekolah Jenis Kebangsaan (T) St. Philomena Convent
 Sekolah Kebangsaan Convent, Teluk Intan
 Sekolah Kebangsaan St. Bernadette'S Convent
 Sekolah Kebangsaan Convent, Taiping
 Sekolah Kebangsaan Convent Aulong, Taiping - One of only three coeducational Convent schools in Malaysia
 Sekolah Jenis Kebangsaan (T) St. Teresa Convent - One of only three coeducational Convent schools in Malaysia
 Sekolah Kebangsaan Convent, Selangor
 Sekolah Kebangsaan Convent (1) (M)
 Sekolah Kebangsaan Convent (2) (M)
 Sekolah Kebangsaan St Anne's Convent, Selangor
 Sekolah Kebangsaan Convent (1) Bukit Nanas (M)
 Sekolah Kebangsaan Convent (2) Bukit Nanas
 Sekolah Kebangsaan Convent Sentul 1 (M)
 Sekolah Kebangsaan Convent Sentul 2 (M)
 Sekolah Jenis Kebangsaan (T) St. Joseph's Convent
 Sekolah Kebangsaan Convent Of The Infant Jesus (1)
 Sekolah Kebangsaan Convent Of The Infant Jesus (2)
 Sekolah Jenis Kebangsaan (C) Notre Dame Convent
 Sekolah Kebangsaan Sacred Heart Convent
 Sekolah Kebangsaan Convent, Batu Pahat
 Sekolah Kebangsaan Convent, Muar
 Sekolah Kebangsaan Infant Jesus Convent
 Sekolah Kebangsaan Canossian Convent, Kluang
 Sekolah Kebangsaan Canossian Convent, Segamat
 Sekolah Kebangsaan Convent, Tanah Rata - One of only three coeducational Convent schools in Malaysia
 Sekolah Kebangsaan St. Francis Convent
 Sekolah Kebangsaan St. Mary Convent

La Salle schools
 Sekolah Kebangsaan St. Theresa
 Sekolah Kebangsaan St. Patrick
 St. Michael's Institution, Ipoh
 St. Xavier's Institution
 Sekolah Kebangsaan St. George Balik Pulau
 Sekolah Kebangsaan Assumption
 Sekolah Kebangsaan La Salle, Ipoh
 Sekolah Kebangsaan St. George 1
 Sekolah Kebangsaan St. Michael
 Sekolah Kebangsaan St. Anthony
 Sekolah Kebangsaan De La Salle
 Sekolah Kebangsaan St. Francis, Perak
 Sekolah Kebangsaan Stella Maris
 La Salle School, Petaling Jaya
 La Salle School, Klang
 Sekolah Kebangsaan La Salle (1) Brickfields
 Sekolah Kebangsaan La Salle (2) Brickfields (M)
 Sekolah Kebangsaan La Salle 1, Jinjang Utara
 Sekolah Kebangsaan La Salle 2, Jinjang Utara
 Sekolah Kebangsaan La Salle (1) Sentul
 Sekolah Kebangsaan La Salle Sentul 2 (M)
 Sekolah Kebangsaan St. Francis, Melaka
 Sekolah Kebangsaan St. Andrew, Johor
 Sekolah Kebangsaan St. Theresa, Kuching
 Sekolah Kebangsaan St. Joseph, Kuching

Anglican Church schools
 Sekolah Kebangsaan St. Alban, Kuching
 Sekolah Kebangsaan St. Alban, Serian
 Sekolah Kebangsaan St. Alban, Duras
 Sekolah Kebangsaan St. Alphonsus
 Sekolah Kebangsaan St. Ambrose
 Sekolah Kebangsaan St. Andrew, Sarikei
 Sekolah Kebangsaan St. Andrew, Simunjan
 Sekolah Kebangsaan St. Andrew, Kuching
 Sekolah Kebangsaan St. Anne
 Sekolah Kebangsaan St. Anthony, Serian
 Sekolah Kebangsaan St. Anthony, Bintulu
 Sekolah Kebangsaan St. Barnabas
 Sekolah Kebangsaan St. Barnabas Baru
 Sekolah Kebangsaan St. Bartholomew
 Sekolah Kebangsaan St. Bernard, Kuching
 Sekolah Kebangsaan St. Bernard, Dalat
 Sekolah Kebangsaan St. Christopher Debak
 Sekolah Kebangsaan St. Columba
 Sekolah Kebangsaan St. David
 Sekolah Kebangsaan St. Dominic, Serian
 Sekolah Kebangsaan St. Dunstan, Kuching
 Sekolah Kebangsaan St. Dunstan, Sriaman
 Sekolah Kebangsaan St. Edmund, Limbang
 Sekolah Kebangsaan St. Edward
 Sekolah Kebangsaan St. Faith Sekama
 Sekolah Kebangsaan St. Francis Xavier, Kanowit
 Sekolah Kebangsaan St. Francis Xavier, Sarawak
 Sekolah Kebangsaan St. Gile
 Sekolah Kebangsaan St. Gregory
 Sekolah Kebangsaan St. Henry
 Sekolah Kebangsaan St. James Quop
 Sekolah Kebangsaan St. James Rayang
 Sekolah Kebangsaan St. John, Betong
 Sekolah Kebangsaan St. John, Dalat
 Sekolah Kebangsaan St. John, Kota Samarahan
 Sekolah Kebangsaan St. John, Sarawak
 Sekolah Kebangsaan St. John, Serian
 Sekolah Kebangsaan St. John Taee, Serian
 Sekolah Kebangsaan St. Joseph, Miri
 Sekolah Kebangsaan St. Joseph, Kuching
 Sekolah Kebangsaan St. Lawrence
 Sekolah Kebangsaan St. Leo Gayau
 Sekolah Kebangsaan St. Luke, Dalat
 Sekolah Kebangsaan St. Luke, Sriaman
 Sekolah Kebangsaan St. Mark, Bentong
 Sekolah Kebangsaan St. Mark, Sibu
 Sekolah Jenis Kebangsaan (C) St. Martin
 Sekolah Kebangsaan St. Martin, Kota Samarahan
 Sekolah Kebangsaan St. Martin, Sriaman
 Sekolah Kebangsaan St. Mary, Sibu
 Sekolah Kebangsaan St. Mary, Sarawak
 Sekolah Kebangsaan St. Mathew
 Sekolah Kebangsaan St. Matthew, Kuching
 Sekolah Kebangsaan St. Matthew, Sibu
 Sekolah Kebangsaan St. Michael, Serian
 Sekolah Kebangsaan St. Michael, Kota Samarahan
 Sekolah Kebangsaan St. Michael, Plassu
 Sekolah Kebangsaan St. Norbert Paun
 Sekolah Kebangsaan St. Paul, Kuching
 Sekolah Kebangsaan St. Paul, Jalan Green
 Sekolah Kebangsaan St. Paul, Sriaman
 Sekolah Kebangsaan St. Paul, Roban
 Sekolah Kebangsaan St. Peter
 Sekolah Kebangsaan St. Peter & St. Paul
 Sekolah Kebangsaan St. Peter Saratok
 Sekolah Kebangsaan St. Philip, Kuching
 Sekolah Kebangsaan St. Philip, Serian
 Sekolah Kebangsaan St. Pius, Marudi
 Sekolah Kebangsaan St. Raymond
 Sekolah Kebangsaan St. Rita
 Sekolah Kebangsaan St. Stephen, Sarawak
 Sekolah Kebangsaan St. Swithun
 Sekolah Kebangsaan St. Teresa, Bau
 Sekolah Kebangsaan St. Teresa, Kuching
 Sekolah Kebangsaan St. Teresa, Serian
 Sekolah Kebangsaan St. Theresa, Kuching
 Sekolah Kebangsaan St. Thomas
 Sekolah Kebangsaan St. Columba, Miri
 Sekolah Kebangsaan St. Joseph, Miri
 Sekolah Kebangsaan St. Pius Long San, Miri
 Sekolah Kebangsaan St. Christopher Debak, Betong
 Sekolah Kebangsaan St. Paul Roban, Betong
 Sekolah Kebangsaan St. Peter Saratok, Betong
 Sekolah Kebangsaan St. Anthony Bintulu
 Sekolah Kebangsaan St. Alban Duras, Kuching
 Sekolah Kebangsaan St. Andrew Kuching
 Sekolah Kebangsaan St. Augustine Padawan, Kuching
 Sekolah Kebangsaan St. Elizabeth Padawan, Kuching
 Sekolah Kebangsaan St. Faith Sekama, Kuching
 Sekolah Kebangsaan St. George, Kuching
 Sekolah Kebangsaan St. Gregory, Kuching
 Sekolah Kebangsaan St. James Quop, Kuching
 Sekolah Kebangsaan St. John Bau, Kuching
 Sekolah Kebangsaan St. Joseph Kuching
 Sekolah Kebangsaan St. Mary Kuching
 Sekolah Kebangsaan St. Matthew, Kuching
 Sekolah Kebangsaan St. Patrick Bau, Kuching
 Sekolah Kebangsaan St. Patrick Padawan, Kuching
 Sekolah Kebangsaan St. Paul Padawan, Kuching
 Sekolah Kebangsaan St. Stephen Bau, Kuching
 Sekolah Kebangsaan St. Teresa Bau, Kuching
 Sekolah Kebangsaan St. Teresa Kuching
 Sekolah Kebangsaan St. Teresa Padungan, Kuching
 Sekolah Kebangsaan St. Thomas Kuching
 Sekolah Kebangsaan St. Edmund, Limbang
 Sekolah Kebangsaan St. Luke Sri Aman
 Sekolah Kebangsaan St. Mary Sibu
 Sekolah Kebangsaan St. Rita Sibu
 Sekolah Kebangsaan St. Alphonsus, Sarikei
 Sekolah Kebangsaan St. Anne, Sarikei
 Sekolah Kebangsaan St. Augustine Meradong, Sarikei
 Sekolah Kebangsaan St. John Taee, Samarahan
 Sekolah Kebangsaan St. Jude Bunan, Samarahan
 Sekolah Kebangsaan St. Martin, Samarahan
 Sekolah Kebangsaan St. Michael, Samarahan
 Sekolah Kebangsaan St. Patrick Tangga, Samarahan
 Sekolah Kebangsaan St. Raymond Mujat, Samarahan
 Sekolah Kebangsaan St. Teresa Serian, Samarahan
 Sekolah Kebangsaan St. John Kampung Medong, Mukah
 Sekolah Kebangsaan St. Jude, Mukah
 Sekolah Kebangsaan St. Kevin Sungai Kut, Mukah
 Sekolah Kebangsaan St. Patrick Mukah
 Sekolah Kebangsaan St. Columba, Miri
 Sekolah Kebangsaan St. Joseph, Miri
 Sekolah Kebangsaan St. Pius Long San, Miri

Diocesan parish schools
 SJK (T) St. Mary, Parit Buntar
 SJK (C) Sacred Heart, Penang
 SK Shang Wu, Penang, 
 SJK (C) St. Joseph, Johor Bahru
 SK St. Joseph, Johor Bahru
 SJK (C) Heng Ee, Penang
 SK Montfort, Batu Pahat
 SK St. Paul, Tanjung Tualang
 Sekolah Kebangsaan St. Augustine, Kuching
 Sekolah Kebangsaan St. Augustine, Bentong
 Sekolah Kebangsaan St. Augustine, Bintangor
 SK Catholic English (M), Kuching
 Sekolah Kebangsaan St. Patrick, Kuching
 Sekolah Kebangsaan St. Patrick, Mukah
 Sekolah Kebangsaan St. Patrick, Bau
 Sekolah Kebangsaan St. Patrick, Serian
 Sekolah Kebangsaan St. Elizabeth
 Sekolah Kebangsaan St. Jude (M), Dalat
 Sekolah Kebangsaan St. Jude (M), Serian
 Sekolah Kebangsaan St. Kevin (M), Dalat

Marist Brothers school
 SJK (C) Sam Tet, Ipoh
 SJK (C) Katholik, Melaka

Others
 Sekolah Kebangsaan Assunta, Petaling Jaya
 Sekolah Kebangsaan Assunta, Kuantan
 Sekolah Kebangsaan St. Joseph, Kuantan

Secondary schools

Methodist schools
 Methodist Boys' School (Penang)
 Methodist Girls' School (Penang)
 Sekolah Menengah Kebangsaan Methodist, Air Tawar
 Sekolah Menengah Kebangsaan Methodist, Ipoh
 Anglo Chinese School, Kampar
 Sekolah Menengah Kebangsaan Methodist, Parit Buntar
 Sekolah Menengah Kebangsaan Methodist, Sungai Siput
 Sekolah Menengah Kebangsaan Methodist, Tanjong Malim
 Anglo Chinese School, Sitiawan
 Sekolah Menengah Kebangsaan Horley Methodist
 Methodist Girls' School, Ipoh
 SMK Treacher Methodist Girls' School
 Sekolah Menengah Kebangsaan Methodist, Selangor
 Anglo Chinese School, Klang
 Methodist Girls' School, Klang
 Methodist Boys' School (Kuala Lumpur)
 Sekolah Menengah Kebangsaan (P) Methodist, Kuala Lumpur
 Sekolah Menengah Kebangsaan Methodist Anglo Chinese School, Negeri Sembilan
 Anglo-Chinese School, Malacca
 Sekolah Menengah Kebangsaan Perempuan Methodist, Melaka
 Methodist Girls Secondary School, Kuantan
 Sekolah Menengah Kebangsaan (P) Methodist, Raub
 Sekolah Menengah Kebangsaan Methodist, Sibu

Convent schools
 SMK Convent St. Nicholas, Alor Setar
 Sekolah Menengah Kebangsaan Convent Father Barre, Sungai Petani
 Sekolah Menengah Kebangsaan St. Anne's Convent, Kulim
 Sekolah Menengah Kebangsaan Convent (M) Bukit Mertajam
 Sekolah Menengah Kebangsaan Convent Butterworth
 Sekolah Menengah Kebangsaan Convent Green Lane
 Sekolah Menengah Kebangsaan Convent Lebuh Light
 Sekolah Menengah Kebangsaan Convent Pulau Tikus
 Convent Datuk Keramat
 Sekolah Menengah Kebangsaan St. Bernadette'S Convent, Batu Gajah
 Sekolah Menengah Kebangsaan Convent, Sitiawan
 Sekolah Menengah Kebangsaan Tarcisian Convent, Ipoh
 SMK Main Convent, Ipoh
 Sekolah Menengah Kebangsaan Ave Maria Convent, Ipoh
 Sekolah Menengah Kebangsaan Convent, Teluk Intan
 SMK Convent Taiping
 Sekolah Menengah Kebangsaan Convent Kajang, Jalan Gereja, Kajang, Selangor
 Sekolah Menengah Kebangsaan Convent Jalan Gereja
 Convent Bukit Nanas
 Sekolah Menengah Kebangsaan Convent Sentul (M)
 Sekolah Menengah Kebangsaan Convent Jalan Peel
 Sekolah Menengah Kebangsaan Canossa Convent
 Infant Jesus Convent
 Sekolah Menengah Kebangsaan Notre Dame Convent
 Sekolah Menengah Kebangsaan Convent Batu Pahat
 Sekolah Kebangsaan Canossian Convent, Kluang
 Sekolah Kebangsaan Canossian Convent, Segamat
 Sekolah Menengah Kebangsaan Infant Jesus Convent, Johor Bahru
 SMK St. Francis Convent (M), Kota Kinabalu
 St Cecilia's Convent Secondary School, Sandakan
 Sekolah Menengah Kebangsaan Convent Jalan Peel 
 Sekolah Menengah Kebangsaan Convent (M) Kajang

La Salle schools
 Sekolah Menengah Kebangsaan St. Michael, Kedah
 Sekolah Menengah Kebangsaan St. Patrick, Kedah
 Sekolah Menengah Kebangsaan St. Theresa
 Sekolah Menengah Kebangsaan St. George, Pulau Pinang
 Sekolah Menengah Kebangsaan St. Xavier
 St. George's Institution, Malaysia
 St. Michael's Institution
 St. Anthony's School, Teluk Intan
 La Salle School, Petaling Jaya
 La Salle School, Klang
 Sekolah Menengah Kebangsaan La Salle Brickfields (M)
 Sekolah Menengah Kebangsaan La Salle Sentul (M)
 St. Paul's Institution, Seremban
 St. Francis Institution
 Sekolah Menengah Kebangsaan St. Thomas, Pahang
 Sekolah Menengah Kebangsaan St. Andrew, Johor
Sekolah Menengah Kebangsaan St. Joseph's Secondary School, Kuching
 SMK Sacred Heart, Sibu, Sibu
 Sekolah Menengah St. Martin, Tambunan
 La Salle Secondary School, Kota Kinabalu

Anglican Church schools
 St. George's Girls' School (Penang, Malaysia)
 Hutchings School, (Penang
 St. Mary's School, Kuala Lumpur
 St. Gabriel's Secondary School, Kuala Lumpur
 St. David's High School, Malacca
 SMK St. Anthony Sarikei
 SMK St. Thomas, Kuching
 Sekolah Menengah Kebangsaan St. Mary, Kuching
 Sekolah Menengah Kebangsaan St. Teresa
 SMK St. Columba, Miri
 SMK St. Thomas, Kuching
 Sekolah Menengah Kebangsaan St. Luke, Sri Aman
 SMK All Saints, Kota Kinabalu
 St. Michael's Secondary School, Sandakan
 SM St. Mary, Papar
 SM St. Paul, Beaufort

Diocesan parish schools
 SMK Sacred Heart, Penang
 SMJK (C) Katholik, Tanjung Malim
 SMJK (C) Heng Ee, Penang
 SMK St. Thomas, Kuantan
 Catholic High School, Bentong
 SMK St. Joseph, Johor Bahru
 SMK St. Teresa, Kuching
 Sekolah Menengah Kebangsaan St. Patrick, Mukah
 Sekolah Menengah Kebangsaan St. Augustine, Betong
 Sekolah Menengah Kebangsaan St. Elizabeth, Sibu
 SM St. James Tenghilan, Tuaran
 SM St. John, Tuaran
 SM St. Michael, Penampang
 SM Stella Maris, Kota Kinabalu
 SM Holy Trinity, Tawau
 SM St. Peter, Telipok
 SM St. Francis Xavier, Keningau
 SM St. Anthony, Tenom
 SM St. Patrick Membakut
 SMK St Peter Bundu
 SM St. John, Beaufort
 SMK St. Martin, Tambunan
 SM St. Peter, Kudat
 SM St. Mary, Sandakan
 SM St. Mike, Sandakan
 SM St. Patrick, Tawau
 SM St. Ursula, Tawau
 SMK St. Dominic, Lahad Datu

Marist Brothers
 SMJK Sam Tet, Ipoh
 Catholic High School, Petaling Jaya
 Catholic High School, Melaka

London Missionary Society
 Penang Free School
 Malacca High School

Mill Hill schools
 St Joseph's School, Miri
 SM St Joseph Papar

Others
 Assunta Secondary School, Petaling Jaya
 Bukit Bintang Girls' School, Kuala Lumpur
 Bukit Bintang Boys School, Petaling Jaya
 Pudu English Secondary School, Kuala Lumpur

References

Religious schools in Malaysia
.Missionary
Malaysia–United Kingdom relations